There are two railway stations that serve Dorchester, Dorset.

 Dorchester South railway station Located on the London Waterloo-Weymouth line.
 Dorchester West railway station Located on the Bristol/Castle Cary-Weymouth "Heart of Wessex" line.